The Pontifical Liturgical Institute in Rome, located at Sant'Anselmo on the Aventine Hill, promotes the study of the Sacred Liturgy. It is entrusted to the Benedictine Confederation, and has the role of training professors of liturgy and liturgical experts to advance the study and teaching of the Church's liturgy in the various parts of the world.

Italian language programme
Almost all of the courses are taught through the medium of the Italian language. Exceptionally, courses are offered in French, German, Spanish, Portuguese or English.

English language programme
Ever since the 1990s, successive presidi (deans) of the PIL have tried to establish English-language programmes of PIL courses in the US in order to provide access for English and Spanish-speaking students. First Prof. Cassian Folsom O.S.B approached the University of Chicago, and later Prof Juan Javier Flores Arcas O.S.B. approached the St Thomas University, Miami, but these have not yet borne fruit. Similarly, further attempts to initiate an English-language liturgy summer school at Sant’Anselmo in Rome have not yet matured.

At the behest of the Dean of the PIL in 2009, the board of the Institutum Liturgicum in Anglia et Cambria requested the Faculty of Theology and Religious Studies of the Catholic University of Leuven to give validation to the Pontifical Institute of Liturgy courses, now taught in Italian in Rome. The request was granted and these courses have been offered in English at the Benedictine Institute, Ealing Abbey in London as a "feeder" programme of studies for the Pontifical Institute of Liturgy since 2011.

Endorsements for the English language programme
The Council of the Preside endorsed the Publishing Project "Documenta Rerum Ecclesiasticarum Instaurata", directors, Fr James Leachman, O.S.B. A monk of St. Benedict's Abbey, Ealing, London; doctor of sacred liturgy, Pontifical Institute of Liturgy, Sant’Anselmo, Rome Principal of Benedictine Study and Arts Centre, Ealing Abbey Co-director of project Appreciating the Liturgy and co-founder of the Institutum liturgicum and Daniel McCarthy OSB in March 2008.

On Thursday 12 November 2009  the Council of the Preside of the Pontifical Institute of Liturgy accepted the proposal of the board of the "Institutum Liturgicum in Anglia et Cambria" to organise the teaching of some PIL courses in the UK, beginning Summer 2011 for a period of five years. The Preside, Fr Ephrem Carr recommended that courses be additionally accredited at a different Pontifical University.

Faculty of the English Language Programme 2020
 Fr Ephrem Carr O.S.B. SEOL, STD (St Meinrad Archabbey, IN) 2011-
 Fr James Leachman O.S.B. SLD (St Benedict's Abbey, Ealing, UK) 2011-
 Fr Daniel McCarthy O.S.B. SLD (St Benedict's Abbey, Atchison, KS) 2011-
 Prof Joris Geldhof, STD (KU Leuven) 2011-
 Fr Stefan Geiger O.S.B, STD (Schaftlarn) 2020-
 associate faculty:
 Dr Vika Lebzyak (KU Leuven) 2016-2018
 Fr Geert Leenknegt STL (Diocese of Ghent) 2018-
 Fr Gregory Carey O.S.B. SLD (St Michael's Abbey, Farnborough, UK) 2019-

Diploma Alumni of Liturgy Institute London
 Mr Duco Vollebregt, Netherlands (2014)
 Fr Geert C. Leenknegt, Belgium (2014)
 Fr Louis Pereira, Bangladesh (2015)
 Mr Robert Brown, USA (2015)
 Fr Victor J. Emmanuel, India (2015)

Course Alumni of Liturgy Institute London
 Mgr Michal Baláž, Slovakia(2014)
 Sr Dr Maura Behrenfeld, USA (2016)
 Rev Michael Dyer, Australia (2013)
 Rev Br. Javed Raza Gill O.P., Pakistan (2011)
 Mr Domenico Incannova Germany (2018) continuing student Germany
 Ms Tina Lasquety, USA (2014) continuing student Germany
 Sr Mary Ann Madhavathu, India (2015) doctorate KU Leuven (2014)
 Br. Michael-Dominique Magielse O.P., Netherlands (2019) continuing student
 Mr Anton Milh, Belgium (2015)
 Rev. Hermano Pablo (2016)
 Sr Walburga Paget O.S.B., UK (2013)
 Ms Isobel Parks, UK (2018)
 Rev Dr Jinu Joseph Puthussery, India (2015)
 Br Dr. Gianfranco Tinello O.F.M., Italy (2019)
 Sr Jaya Therese Vasupurathukaran Pavunny, India (2016)
 Fr Sebeesh Vettiyadan Jacob C.M.I., India (2015) continuing student KULeuven
 Ms Maria Weatherill, Australia (2013)
 Fr Eric Bien, Nigeria, continuing student IL and KULeuven
 Fr Richard Oduor, Kenya, continuing student IL and PIL

resident research student:
 Fr. Roshan Fernando, Sri Lanka (2014–17)

St Bede annual lectures
 Fr Stefan Geiger O.S.B, STD (Schaftlarn) 2020
 Prof Basilius Groen SEOD (Graz) 2019
 Prof Gergely Bakoš O.S.B, STD (Pannonhalma) 2018
 Archbishop George Stack (Cardiff) 2017
 Prof Joris Geldhof (Liturgy Institute, KU Leuven) 2016
 Bishop Alan Hopes (diocese of East Anglia) 2014
 Abbot Cuthbert Brogan O.S.B. (St Michael's Abbey, Farnborough) 2013
 Archbishop Arthur Roche (diocese of Leeds, Congregation of Divine Worship) 2012
 Prof Ephrem Carr O.S.B., SEOL, STD (St Meinrad Abbey, IN) 2011

Distinguished alumni of Pontificium Institutum Liturgicum
 Archbishop Wilton D. Gregory
 Archbishop Leo W. Cushley
 Bishop Christopher J. Coyne
 Bishop Hernaldo Pinto Farias, S.S.S 17 July 2019, diocese of Bonfim, Bahia in the Archdiocese of Feira de Santana, Brasil.
 Fr. Anscar Chupungco, O.S.B.
 Fr. Marcel Rooney, O.S.B.

References

External links
santanselmo.net

Catholic liturgy
Benedictine Confederation
Departments of the Roman Curia
Catholic educational institutions